"Friends with Benefits" (commonly abbreviated to its initials "FWB") is a song by British YouTuber and rapper KSI and Dutch record production trio MNDM from the former's second extended play (EP), Jump Around (2016). The song was released for digital download and streaming by Island Records and Universal Music Group on 29 July 2016 as the second single from the EP. The song's lyrics centre around engaging in a no-strings-attached relationship with a ladyfriend.

"Friends with Benefits" debuted at number 69 on the UK Singles Chart. The music video was released on 5 August 2016. The video stars KSI alongside his no-strings-attached ladyfriend in a series of silly vignettes which show the pair dressing up as various characters to illustrate some choice lyrics from the song. Scenes include KSI dressing up as Elvis Presley, Jimi Hendrix and Kendrick Lamar.

Background and release 

"Friends with Benefits" was written, recorded and produced during a recording studio session in Amsterdam, Netherlands, in February 2016, as documented in KSI's YouTube vlog titled "Amsterdam Music Trip". On 18 July 2016, KSI revealed the song's title, cover art and release date via his social media pages. "Friends with Benefits" was released for digital download and streaming by Island Records and Universal Music Group on 29 July 2016.

Music video 
The music video for "Friends with Benefits" was directed by Harrison Boyce. The video was released to KSI's YouTube channel one week after the release of the song on 5 August 2016. It has received 50 million views. The music video's opening scenes show KSI and several of his Laid in America (2016) co-stars, including Caspar Lee, Alex Wassabi and Gerry Bednob, exiting a limousine upon arrival at a premiere of their film, before walking down a red carpet. The remainder of the video stars KSI alongside American model Jena Frumes, who plays the role of his no-strings-attached ladyfriend, in a series of silly vignettes which show the pair dressing up as various characters to illustrate some choice lyrics from the song. Scenes show the pair dressing up as penguins, a bride and a groom, and a pimp and his girl, as well as KSI dressing up as an old man, Tony Montana from Scarface, Elvis Presley, Jimi Hendrix and Kendrick Lamar. At the end of the music video, there is a 15 seconds-long snippet of the music video for KSI's next single "Jump Around" (2016), featuring American rapper Waka Flocka Flame, which was later released on 3 October 2016.

Commercial performance 
In the United Kingdom, "Friends with Benefits" debuted at number 69 on the UK Singles Chart. The song dropped to number 78 the following week, before dropping out of the chart. "Friends with Benefits" also debuted at number 12 on the UK Hip Hop and R&B Singles Chart and spent a total of seven weeks on the chart.

Credits and personnel 
Credits adapted from Tidal.

 KSIsongwriting, vocals
 MNDMproduction
 Swayproduction, songwriting
 DJ Turkishproduction, songwriting, mixing, mastering
 Charles Cookproduction, songwriting
 Faried Jhauwproduction, songwriting, drums, recording engineering
 Kris Coutinhosongwriting, drums, recording engineering
 Rutti Cruiserecording engineering
 Denise Kroesadditional vocals
 Gia Re Lodge-O'Meallyadditional vocals

Charts

Release history

References 

2016 songs
2016 singles
KSI songs
Songs written by KSI
Songs written by Sway (musician)
Island Records singles
Universal Music Group singles